Charles de Souancé (2 May 1823 – 23 January 1896) was a French ornithologist and a purser in the French Navy, more precisely "Commissaire de la Marine".  He made many studies on the ornithological collection of his  uncle François Victor Masséna and described several  new species of parrots (Psittacidae) in the scientific journal Revue et Magazin de Zoologie.

A subspecies of  the maroon-tailed parakeet, Pyrrhura melanura souancei, is named for him.

Published works 
 Description de quelques nouvelles espèces d'oiseaux de la famille des psittacidés, with François Victor Masséna, 1854 – Description of some new species of birds within the family Psittacidae.
 Iconographie des perroquets, non figurés dans les publications de Levaillant et de M. Bourjot Saint-Hilaire, in collaboration with Charles Lucien Bonaparte and Émile Blanchard,  Paris : P. Bertrand, 1857.

References
Beolens, Bo; & Watkins, Charles. (2003). Whose Bird? Common Bird Names and the People they Commemorate. Yale University Press: New Haven, Connecticut.

French ornithologists
1823 births
1896 deaths